So So Gangsta is the eighth solo studio album by American rapper Daz Dillinger. It was released on September 12, 2006 via So So Def/Virgin Records simultaneously with an instrumental album entitled So So Gangsta - The Album Sampler. Recording sessions took place at Studio Atlantis and at the Crippin Kitchen in Los Angeles, at the Hit Factory Criteria and at Poe Boy Studios in Miami, and at SouthSide Studios in Atlanta. Production was handled by Jermaine Dupri, No I.D., Scott Storch and Daz himself, with LRoc, Ivan Johnson and Soopafly serving as co-producers. It features guest appearances from Avery Storm, Ice Cube, Jagged Edge, Johntá Austin, Kurupt, Rick Ross, Snoop Dogg, Soopafly and The Kid Slim. The album debuted at number 35 on the Billboard 200 with just over 23,000 albums sold its first week. It has reached 150,000 moved units according to SoundScan on October 10, 2007.

The album spawned two singles: "On Some Real Shit" and "Weekend". Music video for "On Some Real Shit" was directed by Juwan Lee, while the single made it to number 90 on the Hot R&B/Hip-Hop Songs. Music video for "All I Need" was directed by D. Baker, and music video for "Thang on My Hip" was directed by Daz and Todd 1.

Track listing

Sample credits
Track 1 contains samples from the composition "Friends or Lovers" written by Raeford Gerald and performed by Act One

Personnel

Delmar "Daz Dillinger" Arnaud – main artist, producer (tracks: 3, 5, 8, 9, 12), recording (tracks: 3, 5, 9, 12)
William "Rick Ross" Roberts II – featured artist (track 2)
Johntá Austin – featured artist (track 4)
Calvin "Snoop Dogg" Broadus – featured artist (track 5)
Priest "Soopafly" Brooks – featured artist (track 5), co-producer (tracks: 3, 5)
Ralph "Avery Storm" Di Stasio – featured artist (track 6)
Ricardo "Kurupt" Brown – featured artist (track 7)
O'Shea "Ice Cube" Jackson – featured artist (track 8)
Jaron "The Kid Slim" Alston – featured artist (track 9)
Jagged Edge – featured artists (track 11)
Ernest "No I.D." Wilson – producer (track 1)
Jermaine Dupri – producer (tracks: 2, 4, 6, 10, 11), mixing (tracks: 1-6, 8, 10-12), executive producer
Scott Storch – producer (track 7)
James "LRoc" Phillips – co-producer (tracks: 2, 4, 6, 11)
Ivan Johnson – co-producer (tracks: 8, 9, 12)
John Horesco IV – recording (tracks: 1, 2, 4, 6, 10, 11)
Tadd "Rowdy Rik" Mingo – recording (tracks: 2, 3, 5, 6, 8-10, 12)
Elvin "Big Chuck" Prince – recording (track 2)
Conrad Golding – recording (track 7)
Wayne Allison – recording (track 7)
Phil Tan – mixing (tracks: 1-6, 8, 10-12)
Doug Wilson – mixing (track 7)
Rufus Morgan – assistant recording (track 8)
Josh Houghkirk – assistant mixing (tracks: 3, 5, 8, 12)
Reed Taylor – assistant mixing (track 7)
Vlado Meller – mastering
Will Ragland – art direction, design
Kate McGregor – art coordinator
Kai Regan – photography
Sterling J. Carroll III – A&R
Ronette Bowie – A&R
Eddie "Skeeter Rock" Weathers – A&R
Bret D. Lewis – legal

Charts

References

External links

2006 albums
Daz Dillinger albums
Virgin Records albums
Albums produced by No I.D.
Albums produced by Soopafly
So So Def Recordings albums
Albums produced by Scott Storch
Albums produced by Daz Dillinger
Albums produced by Jermaine Dupri